Voglia di vivere (Desire for life) is a 1990 Italian drama television film directed by Lodovico Gasparini. It is based on real life events of Augusto and Michaela Odone and their son Lorenzo Odone. The same events inspired the 1992 film Lorenzo's Oil. It was shot between Capri and San Francisco.

Cast 

 Tomas Milian: Tony 
 Dominique Sanda: Linda 
 Matthew Ousdahl: Bobby  
 Carmen Scarpitta:  Dr. Rosemund

References

External links

1990 television films
1990 films
1990 drama films
Italian drama films
Italian films based on actual events
Medical-themed films
Films shot in San Francisco
Films about diseases
Films directed by Lodovico Gasparini
1990s Italian films